Where's Jack? is a 1969 British adventure film recounting the exploits of notorious 18th-century criminal Jack Sheppard and London "Thief-Taker General" Jonathan Wild.

The film was produced by Stanley Baker through his company Oakhurst Productions, and starred Baker himself as Jonathan Wild. Tommy Steele played Jack Sheppard. The film was directed by novelist James Clavell. Mary Hopkin sings the title song.

Plot
The film depicts the adventures and the exploits of notorious English thief and prison-breaker Jack Sheppard in 1720s London.

The ending of the film is ambiguous, and suggests that Sheppard may have survived his execution and escaped to the Americas.

Cast
Tommy Steele as Jack Sheppard 
Stanley Baker as Jonathan Wild 
Alan Badel as The Lord Chancellor 
Dudley Foster as Blueskin
Fiona Lewis as Edgworth Bess Lyon 
Sue Lloyd as Lady Darlington 
Noel Purcell as Leatherchest  
Eddie Byrne as Rev. Wagstaff   
Michael Elphick as Hogarth 
Howard Goorney as Surgeon  
John Hallam as The Captain   
Harold Kasket as The King   
Caroline Munro as Madame Vendonne 
Cardew Robinson as Lord Mayor  
George Woodbridge as Hangman

Production
Financing was provided by Paramount. According to producer Michael Deeley, this was obtained after a pitch made by Martin Baum, Stanley Baker's agent, to Charles Bludhorn, owner of Paramount. Baum described the film as being written by the writers of Point Blank (1967), produced by the maker of Zulu (1963) and directed by the man who made To Sir, with Love (1967) which, combined, made a profit of $45 million. Divided by four, that would have meant a profit of over $10 million after the $3 million cost was deducted. The pitch was successful, and Deeley says it remains one of his happiest memories in getting a film funded.

Peter Bart, an executive at Paramount at the time, says Stanley Baker did the presentation with Deeley and Baum. Bart says Bludhorn believed that expensive films made the most money and was attracted to Where's Jack? in part by its cost, agreeing to finance without reading a script. He also claims that Deeley presented him with the relatively inexpensive The Italian Job and that Bart arranged for it to be financed without telling Bludhorn; Italian Job would go on to be a far more successful film.

Peter Yates said at the time that Stanley Baker was "rescuing" Tommy Steele from Hollywood musicals "to do some acting again". The film was announced in February 1968.

Filming took place in Ireland in June 1968. It finished by September.

Reception
Where's Jack? turned out to be a box office flop. The film was not even released in the USA after performing poorly in Europe.

The Los Angeles Times wrote that it was "astonishingly similar, markedly better" to another film about a highwayman that came out around the same time, Sinful Davey.

References

External links 
 

1969 films
1969 adventure films
1960s historical adventure films
British crime films
British biographical films
1969 crime films
British historical adventure films
Films set in the 1720s
Films set in London
Films directed by James Clavell
Paramount Pictures films
1960s English-language films
1960s British films